Ingo Schulze (born 15 December 1962) is a German writer born in Dresden in former East Germany.  He studied classical philology at the University of Jena for five years, and, until German reunification, was an assistant director (dramatic arts advisor) at the State Theatre in Altenburg 45 km south of Leipzig for two years. After sleeping through the events of the night of 9 November 1989, Schulze started a newspaper with friends. He was encouraged to write. Schulze spent six months in St Petersburg which became the basis for his debut collection of short stories 33 Moments of Happiness (1995).

Schulze has won a number of awards for his novels and stories, which have been translated into twenty languages, among them into English by John E. Woods. In 2007, he was awarded the Thüringer Literaturpreis. In 2013 he was awarded the Bertolt-Brecht-Literaturpreis.

Life 
Schulze, the son of a physicist and a doctor, grew up with his mother after his parents' divorce. After completing his Abitur, which he took in 1981 at the Kreuzschule in Dresden, he completed basic military service in the National People's Army. Until 1988 he studied classical philology at the Friedrich-Schiller University of Jena.

Subsequently, Schulze was a dramaturg at the Landestheater of Altenburg, which he left in order to work as a journalist. In 1990 he was a cofounder of the 'independent newspaper' the Alternburger Wochenblatt, which was operational until Autumn 1991, as well as an Offertenblatt (a kind of newspaper for classified ads) called the Anzeiger. Both were published by the Alternburg publishing house, which was managed by Schulze until the end of 1992. In early 1993 he went to Russia, where he launched the advertising newspaper Привет Петербург (Privet Petersburg).

Since the mid-1990s Schulze has lived as a freelance author in Berlin. He and his wife have two daughters.

Since 2006 he has been a member of the Berlin Academy of the Arts and, since 2007, of the German Academy for Language and Poetry in Darmstadt. He is also a member of the Saxony Academy of the Arts and the PEN Centre Germany.

In Autumn 2019 Schulze curated the forum:autoren at the Munich Literature Festival. The theme was titled 'Exercises in paradise. Questions to the world after 1989.'

Awards 
 1995 Alfred-Döblin-Förderpreis
 1995 Ernst-Willner-Preis beim Ingeborg-Bachmann-Wettbewerb
 1995 Aspekte-Literaturpreis
 1998 Johannes-Bobrowski-Medaille
 2001 Joseph-Breitbach-Preis (gemeinsam mit Dieter Wellershoff und Thomas Hürlimann)
 2006 Finalist für den Deutschen Buchpreis: Neue Leben
 2006 Peter-Weiss-Preis
 2007 Thüringer Literaturpreis
 2007 Preis der Leipziger Buchmesse
 2008 Premio Grinzane Cavour
 2008 Samuel-Bogumil-Linde-Preis
 2008 Finalist of Deutscher Buchpreis: Adam und Evelyn
 2009 Longlist of the International IMPAC Dublin Literary Award
 2011 Mainzer Stadtschreiber
 2013 Bertolt-Brecht-Literaturpreis
 2013 Manhae-Preis
 2017 Rheingau Literatur Preis
 2019 Werner-Bergengruen-Preis
 2020 Officers Cross of the Order of Merit of the Federal Republic of Germany

Publications 
 33 Augenblicke des Glücks, Berlin 1995 ("33 Moments of Happiness")
 Simple Storys, Berlin 1998 [German text under an English heading]
 Der Brief meiner Wirtin, Ludwigsburg 2000
 Von Nasen, Faxen und Ariadnefäden, Berlin 2000
 Mr. Neitherkorn und das Schicksal, Berlin 2001
 Würde ich nicht lesen, würde ich auch nicht schreiben, Lichtenfels 2002
 Neue Leben, Berlin 2005
 Handy. Dreizehn Storys in alter Manier, Berlin 2007
 Adam und Evelyn, Berlin 2008.
 One More Story: Thirteen Stories in the Time-Honored Mode.  2010

References

External links 

 German audio samples of "Neue Leben" and "Handy"

1962 births
Living people
Writers from Dresden
People from Bezirk Dresden
20th-century German novelists
21st-century German novelists
German male novelists
20th-century German male writers
21st-century German male writers
Aufstehen
People educated at the Kreuzschule
University of Jena alumni
Members of the Academy of Arts, Berlin
Officers Crosses of the Order of Merit of the Federal Republic of Germany